"Superstar" is a song by Nigerian recording artist Ice Prince, released by Chocolate City on April 22, 2011. It is the second single from the rapper's debut studio album, Everybody Loves Ice Prince (2011).
The song reached number 1 on charts across Nigeria and the continent, but did not achieve the same level of astronomical popularity that its predecessor "Oleku" had. Even so, many observers of the music industry noted the song as one of the most notable Nigerian songs of 2011.

Music video and accolades
"Superstar" is a club and radio friendly song about being rich and famous. The music video was released on 2 August 2011; it won the Most Gifted Hip-hop Video of the Year award at the 2012 Channel O Music Video Awards.

Track listing
 Digital single

Release history

References 

2011 singles
Hip hop songs
Ice Prince songs
Song recordings produced by Jesse Jagz